The Uniform Mechanical Code (UMC) is a model code developed by the International Association of Plumbing and Mechanical Officials (IAPMO) to govern the installation, inspection and maintenance of HVAC (heating, ventilating and air-conditioning) and refrigeration systems. It is designated as an American National Standard.

The UMC is developed using the American National Standards Institute's (ANSI) consensus development procedures. This process brings together volunteers representing a variety of viewpoints and interests to achieve consensus on mechanical issues.

The UMC is designed to provide consumers with safe mechanical systems while, at the same time, allowing latitude for innovation and new technologies. The public at large is encouraged to provide input for the development process. The code is updated every three years. A code development timeline and other relevant information are available at IAPMO's website.

History
In 1926, a group of Los Angeles plumbing inspectors recognized that there were no uniform requirements for the installation and maintenance of plumbing systems. At that time, heating was done by boilers that piped the heat to radiators. Efficient air conditioning was not available. Widely divergent practices and the use of many different, often conflicting, plumbing codes by local jurisdictions led to plumbing systems that were incompatible and potentially dangerous. This underscored the necessity of developing a model code that could be uniformly applied across jurisdictions.

Two years later, the city adopted the first version of a uniform plumbing and mechanical code developed by the Los Angeles City Plumbing Inspectors Association (LACPIA) and based on the input from a committee of plumbing inspectors, master and journeyman plumbers, and mechanical engineers, assisted by public utility companies and the plumbing industry.

The ultimate product of this effort, the first Uniform Mechanical Code, was published by IAPMO, the new name for LACPIA, which was adopted in 1966 when the scope of mechanical work grew beyond plumbing and became more readily available in residential applications. in 1967. Over the last fifty years, this voluntary code has been adapted by jurisdictions not only throughout the United States, but internationally as well. The consensus development process was first applied to the 2003 edition.

The 2012 edition is the fourth edition developed under the ANSI consensus process. Contributions to the content of the code were made by every segment of the building industry, including such diverse interests as consumers, enforcing authorities, installers/maintainers, insurance, labor, manufacturers, research/standards/testing laboratories, special experts, and users. The 2012 Uniform Mechanical Code is supported by the American Society of Sanitary Engineering (ASSE), the Mechanical Contractors Association of America (MCAA), the Plumbing-Heating-Cooling Contractors National Association (PHCC-NA), the United Association (UA) and the World Plumbing Council (WPC).

2018 Edition
Major changes to the 2018 UMC include:
New requirements for piping, tubing, balancing, louvers, protection of piping, mechanical systems and ductwork
New provisions for evaporative cooling systems
Refrigeration port protection requirement
New requirements for piping, tubing and fittings used in hydronic systems

2021 Edition
Significant changes to the 2021 UMC include:
New Appendix F – Geothermal Energy Systems
New guards and rails requirements for installation of equipment and appliances on roofs
New ventilation requirements for transient and nontransient occupancies
New ventilation requirements for indoor air quality for residential occupancies
Revisions to the requirements for air ducts, including factory-made air ducts and dampers
New provisions for factory-built grease ducts
New provisions for refrigeration systems, including pressure-limiting devices and hydrostatic expansion
Revisions to the sizing requirements for natural gas and propane piping systems
Modifications to the pressure rating requirements for hydronic piping applications
New requirements for fuel gas piping appliance shutoff valves, test pressure and overpressure protection devices
New tube fastener provisions for radiant heating and cooling
New requirements for residential compressed natural gas (CNG) fueling systems
New fire-extinguishing equipment and carbon monoxide detection requirements for exhaust systems

Content
 Chapter 1 - Administration
 Chapter 2 - Definitions
 Chapter 3 - General Regulations
 Chapter 4 - Ventilation Air
 Chapter 5 - Exhaust Systems (Part 1: Environmental Air Ducts and Product Conveying Systems; Part 2: Commercial Hoods and Kitchen Ventilation)
 Chapter 6 - Duct Systems
 Chapter 7 - Combustion Air
 Chapter 8 - Chimney and Vents
 Chapter 9 - Installation of Specific Appliances
 Chapter 10 - Boilers and Pressure Vessels
 Chapter 11 - Refrigeration (Part 1: Refrigeration Systems; Part 2: Cooling Towers)
 Chapter 12 - Hydronics (Part 1: Steam and Water Piping; Part 2: Hydronic Panel Heating Systems)
 Chapter 13 - Fuel Gas Piping (Part 1: Fuel Piping; Part 2: Fuel Supply: Manufactured/Mobile Home Parks and Recreational Vehicle Parks)
 Chapter 14 - Process Piping
 Chapter 15 - Solar Energy Systems
 Chapter 16 - Stationary Power Plants
 Chapter 17 - Referenced Standards
 Appendix A - Residential Plans Examiner Review Form for HVAC System Design
 Appendix B - Procedures to be Followed to Place Gas Equipment in Operation
 Appendix C - Installation and Testing of Oil (Liquid) Fuel-Fired Equipment
 Appendix D - Fuel Supply: Manufactured/Mobile Home Parks and Recreational Vehicle Parks
 Appendix E - Sustainable Practices
 Appendix F - Geothermal Energy Systems
 Appendix G - Sizing of Venting Systems and Outdoor Combustion and Ventilation Opening Design
 Appendix H - Example Calculation of Outdoor Air Rate

See also
 IAPMO
 IAPMO Standards
 IAPMO R&T
 Uniform Codes
 Uniform Plumbing Code
 Uniform Swimming Pool, Spa and Hot Tub Code
 Uniform Solar Energy and Hydronics Code
 Building officials
 Building inspection

References

External links
 IAPMO Website
 IAPMO Codes Website
 Uniform Mechanical Code Website

Safety codes
Heating, ventilation, and air conditioning